Luchtenburg is a hamlet in the Dutch province of Gelderland. It is a part of the municipality of Buren, and is located in about 8 km southwest of Veenendaal.

Luchtenburg is not a statistical entity, and the postal authorities have placed it under Ingen. The hamlet consists of about 40 houses.

Gallery

References

Populated places in Gelderland
Buren